Akalpia is a genus of harvestmen in the family Sclerosomatidae from India and Japan.

Species
 Akalpia oblonga Roewer, 1915
 Akalpia nipponica Sato & Suzuki, 1938

References

Harvestman genera
Sclerosomatidae